Holy Trinity Church, in Marylebone, Westminster, London, is a Grade I listed former Anglican church, built in 1828 and designed by John Soane. In 1818 Parliament passed an act setting aside one million pounds to celebrate the defeat of Napoleon. This is one of the so-called "Waterloo churches" that were built with the money. It has an external pulpit facing onto Marylebone Road,  erected in memory of the Revd. William Cadman MA (1815-1891), who was  rector of the parish from 1859 - 1891, renowned for his sonorous voice and preaching The building has an entrance off-set with four large Ionic columns. There is a lantern steeple, similar to St Pancras New Church, which is also on Euston Road to the east.

George Saxby Penfold was appointed as the first Rector, having previously taken on much the same task as the first Rector of Christ Church, Marylebone.
The first burial took place in the vault of the church in 1829, and the last was that of Sir Jonathan Wathen Waller in 1853.

By the 1930s, the use of the church had declined, and from 1936 it was used as a book warehouse by the newly founded Penguin Books. A children's slide was used to deliver books from the street into the large crypt. In 1937 Penguin moved out to Harmondsworth, and the Society for Promoting Christian Knowledge (SPCK), an Anglican missionary organisation, moved in. It was their headquarters until 2006, when they relocated to Tufton Street, Westminster (they have since moved again to Pimlico). The church is currently the location of the world's first wedding department store, The Wedding Gallery, which is based on the ground floor and basement level. The first floor is used as an events space operated by One Events and known as "One Marylebone".

The former church stands on a traffic island by itself, bounded by Marylebone Road at the front, and Albany Street and Osnaburgh Street on either side; the street at the rear north side is Osnaburgh Terrace.

References

Grade I listed churches in the City of Westminster
Religious organizations established in 1828
Churches completed in 1828
John Soane buildings
19th-century Church of England church buildings
Former churches in the City of Westminster
Former Church of England church buildings
1828 establishments in England